The New Perspective (TNP) is a student-operated newspaper published at Carroll University in Waukesha, Wisconsin since 1874. TNP is free and distributed throughout the campus and city.

Circulation 
The New Perspective is published every other Tuesday during the academic year, except during holidays, semester breaks, and exam periods. Its circulation is 1,500.

History 
At its inception in 1874, the paper was known as the Carroll Echo. Throughout its tenure, the paper added photographs and cartoons, as it developed into a modern newspaper.

In 1968, the name of the paper was changed from the Carroll Echo to The Perspective.

In 1976, Gary Stevens, the faculty advisor for the newspaper, suggested the editor-in-chief position be replaced with an editorial staff. The Student Senate approved the idea.  With this change came another name change, to The New Perspective.

Online 
The New Perspective's website features all newspaper content in a digital format, as well as multimedia such as videos, photo galleries, and audio slideshows. The website serves as a way to release breaking news, be environmentally friendly and allow readers to interact through online comments and other forms of social media.

References

External links 
 
 Carroll University's Newspaper Archive

Carroll University
Publications established in 1874
Student newspapers published in Wisconsin
1874 establishments in Wisconsin